The East Paris train wreck was a head-on collision between two trains, which occurred on the Pere Marquette Railway on December 26, 1903. The crash was caused after a westbound stop signal was blown out by strong winds, causing the westbound train to fail to stop, and collide with an eastbound train.

The accident 
However, the signal had been extinguished by the heavy snow and winds. Shortly after, the two trains collided into each other on a long, sweeping curve, causing them to overturn. The crash killed 19 people and injured around 40 more; Two more victims later died of their injuries. Immediately after the crash, local farmers who had witnessed the two engines approaching each other assisted in removing casualties from the wreck.

Investigation 
Following the crash, the company investigated the events leading up to it. They found that staff at nearby McCords station had been aware there would be an accident 10 minutes in advance, after realising the signal was not showing up. However, despite alerting a local farmer, they were unable to prevent the crash.

References 

Accidents and incidents involving Pere Marquette Railway
East Paris train wreck
East Paris train wreck
East Paris train wreck
East Paris